Catherine Joanna Rowett (born 29 December 1956, previously publishing as Catherine Osborne from 1979 to 2011) is a British former Member of the European Parliament representing the Green Party of England and Wales, and academic. She is Professor of Philosophy at the University of East Anglia. She is known in particular for her work on Greek Philosophy, especially the Pre-Socratic philosophers. She was a Green Party Member of the European Parliament (MEP) for the East of England from 2019 until 31 January 2020, when the United Kingdom left the European Union.

Academic career 
Rowett read Classics at the King's College, Cambridge, where she was also awarded her PhD with a dissertation on Hippolytus of Rome and Pre-Socratic philosophers. The dissertation was published as Rethinking Early Greek Philosophy: Hippolytus of Rome and the Presocratics by Cornell University Press in 1987.

Rowett became a Junior Research Fellow of New Hall, Cambridge in 1984. In 1987, she took up a Senior Research Fellowship at St Anne's College, Oxford while also a British Academy Postdoctoral Fellow. From 1990 Rowett was a lecturer in philosophy at Swansea University. On leaving Swansea in 2000, Rowett became Reader in Greek Culture at the University of Liverpool and then 2003 she moved to the University of East Anglia as a lecturer in philosophy. Rowett became Reader in 2006 and then Professor of Philosophy in 2008. She was the Head of the School of Philosophy (later incorporated into the current School of Politics, Philosophy, Language and Communication Studies) from 2005 to 2008.

Rowett was awarded a Leverhulme Trust Research Fellowship from 2007 to 2009 for her work on knowledge and truth in Plato, which formed the foundation of her work published as Knowledge and Truth in Plato: Stepping Past the Shadow of Socrates by Oxford University Press in 2018.

Political career
Rowett stood as a Green Party candidate for the constituency of South Norfolk in the 2015 and 2017 general elections.

She was selected as the lead Green Party candidate for the East of England in the 2019 European Parliament election and was elected with her Green Party list receiving 12.7% of the votes cast. The party topped the poll in Norwich with 26% of the votes cast in the city. Her seat was dissolved on 31 January 2020, following the United Kingdom's exit from the European Union.

Selected publications

As Catherine Rowett 
 Knowledge and Truth in Plato: Stepping Past the Shadow of Socrates (Oxford University Press, 2018)

As Catherine Osborne 
 Philoponus: On Aristotle Physics 1.4-9 (Ancient Commentators on Aristotle, Duckworth, 2009)
 Dumb beasts and Dead Philosophers: Humanity and the Humane in Ancient Philosophy and Literature (Oxford University Press, 2007)
 Philoponus Commentary on Aristotle's Physics book 1.1-3 (Ancient Commentators on Aristotle, Duckworth, 2006)
 Presocratic Philosophy: a very Short Introduction (Oxford University Press, 2004)
 Eros Unveiled: Plato and the God of Love (Clarendon Press, 1994)
 Rethinking Early Greek Philosophy: Hippolytus of Rome and the Presocratics (Cornell University Press, 1987)

References

External links 

 University of East Anglia staff page
 Facebook

1956 births
Living people
British classical scholars
Women classical scholars
Alumni of King's College, Cambridge
Academics of the University of East Anglia
Green Party of England and Wales MEPs
Green Party of England and Wales parliamentary candidates
MEPs for England 2019–2020
21st-century women MEPs for England